Xanthodaphne pederzanii is an extinct species of sea snail, a marine gastropod mollusk in the family Raphitomidae.

Description

Distribution
Fossils of this marine species were found in Pleistocene strata of Emilia-Romagna, Italy.

References

 Tabanelli C. & Bongiardino C. (2018). Una nuova Xanthodaphne nella serie marina plio-pleistocenica della Romagna con notizie sulla sua ecologia e distribuzione temporale (Gastropoda: Conoidea: Raphitomidae). Bollettino Malacologico. 54(2): 188–194.

pederzanii
Gastropods described in 2018